Uptown or The Bluff (also known by its former name Soho and prior to the 20th century as Boyd's Hill) is a neighborhood in the city of Pittsburgh, Pennsylvania to the southeast of the city's Central Business District. It is bordered in the north by the Hill District and located across the Monongahela River from South Side. The predominant area zip code is 15219.

This area is home to Mercy Hospital as well as Duquesne University.  It also includes a residential community that was once flourishing during the first half of the 20th century.  Uptown is also the home of the Pittsburgh Fire Bureau 4 Engine and 4 Truck.

History
The area was known to American frontiersmen and colonists as Ayer's Hill in honor of a fortification built by the English commander Ayers in the mid-1700s.  Sometime near the Revolutionary War and throughout the 19th century the area was referred to as Boyd's Hill in the expanding frontier and then industrial city.  The name is said to have been given to the neighborhood after a newly arrived businessman swayed by Hugh Brackenridge, left his downtown office and hanged himself on the hill.

Uptown was first developed by James Tustin, an eccentric English émigré who built an estate in the area in the late eighteenth or early nineteenth century. His home featured an English taste in architecture and a fruit orchard, and was acknowledged at the time to have been "the most beautiful place in Pittsburgh," according to a 1915 article in the Pittsburgh Gazette–Times. Tustin named his estate "Soho" after his previous residence in Britain, and the name came to be generally applied to the neighborhood.

The neighborhood was originally part of Pitt Township, but was annexed in 1846. The addition was precipitated by the city's efforts at regrowth following a cataclysmic fire in 1845, which destroyed  and 1,000 buildings.

A 1922 guidebook, A History of Pittsburgh and Environs, noted that the area's houses were "old and not attractive, and are largely populated by foreign mill workers and their families", and a 1977 guide remarked that it was once "a pleasant residential area for many wealthy Pittsburghers" but "as industry moved in, the wealthy moved out". The neighborhood was adversely affected by Pittsburgh's urban renewal campaign in the 1960s, and in the estimation of some, "has never been reassembled".

Construction projects in the area include expansion by Duquesne University, and development surrounding the newly completed arena for the Pittsburgh Penguins.

Neighborhood character
Fifth Avenue is home to law offices such as nationally recognized Schiffman Firm, LLC and a few restaurants and bars, but vacant storefronts and small street parking lots for Downtown commuters are prevalent as well. Brick rowhouses are common in the neighborhood.

There are significant efforts in the community to reassert a sense of identity, and residents range from Downtown workers and long-time residents to university students and health professionals.

City Steps
While the Bluff / Uptown neighborhood only has two distinct flights of city steps - it is home to one of the oldest and most striking. Connecting Bluff Street to Second Avenue is a 170 steps flight that also includes a walkway overpass above the Boulevard of the Allies. It is a very popular way to connect Duquesne University students, faculty, and staff to the 10th Street Bridge and the Southside. These City Steps of Pittsburgh quickly connect pedestrians to public transportation and provide an easy way to travel through this densely populated area.

Surrounding and adjacent Pittsburgh neighborhoods
Uptown has four land borders with Downtown Pittsburgh to the west and northwest, the Crawford-Roberts section of the Hill District to the north, West Oakland to the northeast and South Oakland to the east.

The entire Bluff runs adjacent to the western section of the South Side Flats across the Monongahela River; the two neighborhoods are accessible to each other by the South Tenth Street and Birmingham Bridges.

Gallery

See also
List of Pittsburgh neighborhoods

References

Further reading 
Post Gazette article on the 19th century history of the area

Post-Gazette on residential renovations in the Bluff

Neighborhoods in Pittsburgh
Economy of Pittsburgh
Pittsburgh History & Landmarks Foundation Historic Landmarks
Academic enclaves